Baby Naznin (born 23 August 1965) is a Bangladeshi singer. She won the 2003BACHSAS Award for Best Female Playback Singer. She also won the 2003 Bangladesh National Film Award for Best Female Playback Singer for her performance in the film Sahoshi Manush Chai. She is dubbed "Black Diamond" in Bangladesh.

Biography
Naznin was born on 23 August in 1965 in Saidpur, Nilphamari in what was then East Pakistan. She has a sister, Lini Sabrin. Her first lesson in song was started under her father, Mansur Sarkar. She started singing on stage when she was just seven years old. She sang her first movie song in 1980. In her early days, Naznin was also a volleyball player and once represented Rajshahi division.

In 1987 Naznin released 12 modern songs as her first album, Patramita, under the music direction of Maksud Jamil Mintu. Then the albums Nisshobdo Sur, Kal Sara Raat, Prem Korileo Daay, and Duchokhe Ghum Aase Na strengthened her position in modern songs. She released her 50th solo album in 2014.

So far, she has released over two hundred mixed albums. She also has three books of poetry in the market named Shey, Thotey Bhalobasha and Priyomukh.

Naznin sought nomination to compete at the Nilphamari-4 constituency representing the Bangladesh Nationalist Party  (BNP) for the 2018 Bangladeshi general election. As of November 2020, she resides in the United States and serving as the assistant secretary for international affairs of the BNP.

Works
Albums
 Shankha Nadir Majhi (2011)

Film songs

References

External links

Living people
1965 births
People from Nilphamari District
20th-century Bangladeshi women singers
20th-century Bangladeshi singers
Bangladeshi playback singers
Best Female Playback Singer National Film Award (Bangladesh) winners
Best Female Singer Bachsas Award winners
21st-century Bangladeshi women singers
21st-century Bangladeshi singers